A.D. Hopkins is an American novelist, editor, and journalist.

Early life and education
Hopkins was born in Stuart, Virginia, a small town five miles east of the Blue Ridge Mountains.

In 1961–62 he attended Florida State University and was influenced by Pulitzer Award–winner Michael Shaara. Hopkins transferred to the University of Richmond, where he edited the student literary magazine The Messenger and studied creative writing under Novelist and Historian Clifford Dowdey. Hopkins graduated from the University of Richmond, Virginia in 1965 with a BA in English and Journalism.

Family
Hopkins is married to the former Patricia Sheppard, and they have one son, Aaron S, "ASH" Hopkins, of Minnesota. Hopkins is an ordained elder of the Presbyterian Church, USA, a former Boy Scout leader, and a former fencing teacher.

Career
Hopkins worked for the News & Advance in Lynchburg, Virginia and other newspapers in Petersburg, Virginia, as well as Greensboro, North Carolina before moving to Las Vegas, Nevada in 1969.

While at the Las Vegas Sun (1969–73), Hopkins did investigative reporting and covered crime, organized labor, and the convention industry. His work appeared in magazines including Relic, True West, Frontier Times, Nevada Magazine, and airline in-flight magazines. His best-known magazine piece is an account of nineteenth-century shootists: "Gunfighters of Pioche" (Nevada Magazine, September/October 1986).

In 1973 Hopkins was hired as managing editor of the Valley Times, a North Las Vegas bi-weekly, which soon became a daily—competing against and often scooping the city's two longer-established dailies. At the time, neither established daily covered the city's principal industry of gambling, and Hopkins began doing so despite the Valley Times’s much smaller circulation and staff. The two larger newspapers followed the smaller paper's lead, and gaming remains an important assignment in Las Vegas media.

In 1977 Hopkins moved to the city's largest daily, the Las Vegas Review-Journal. As editor of Nevadan, the Review-Journal's Sunday magazine, he roamed the state interviewing colorful characters and digging into state history in old courthouse records. He was later designated the newspaper's special projects editor.

In 1991, Hopkins reported that Richard "Richie the Fixer" Perry, a gambler already convicted in the Boston College basketball point-shaving scandal, was hanging around the UNLV basketball program. Close association with any gambler was then forbidden by NCAA rules. UNLV questioned the reports until May 26, 1991, when the newspaper published photos of Perry and three team members sharing a spa in Perry's backyard. Although it was never proved that UNLV players had shaved points, the "Hot Tub Photos" led to Coach Jerry Tarkanian’s resignation and Perry's listing in Nevada's "Black Book" of persons who cannot legally enter any Nevada casino.

One of Hopkins's most ambitious projects was creating and running a survey known as the Judicial Evaluation Survey. Nevada judges are elected, but there are so many courts in urban areas that voters usually know very little about the candidates. Working with a committee of lawyers, judges, and statisticians, Hopkins wrote questions for objectively evaluating incumbent judges by lawyers who had appeared in their courts. Published prior to filing deadlines since 1992, the resulting ratings give voters reliable information about incumbents and encourage opposition or even retirement for mediocre jurists. The Review-Journal’s survey has been the prototype for similar surveys in other cities and countries.

In 1993 Hopkins wrote that the Nevada Supreme Court had secretly intervened in disciplinary proceedings against a Reno judge. Certain justices involved in the cover-up hired an investigator and gave him authority to discover and punish Hopkins's sources, but the quest was unsuccessful. The judge resigned in return for a federal agreement not to prosecute him, and his two most ardent supporters on the Supreme Court chose not to run for re-election.

A story by Hopkins published March 24, 2000 proved that errors in calculating "prevailing wages," paid on all public works construction projects in the state, inflated pay rates and cost taxpayers millions per year. The Nevada State Press Association named this project its "Story of the Year." Hopkins has won numerous other awards for news stories.

In 1999 Hopkins and the late K.J. Evans co-edited The First 100, Profiles of the Men and Women Who Shaped Las Vegas. The work consisted of a hundred biographic pieces about people whose actions determined the nature of Las Vegas, from explorer Charles Fremont in the 1840s to casino magnates of the 1990s. Originally published in the Review-Journal, the stories were also published as a book.

In 2001 the newspaper's parent company, Stephens Media, designated Hopkins founding editor of Cerca, a magazine that focused on outdoor travel attractions in Southern Nevada and nearer parts of other states. Hopkins also edited a number of books for Stephens Press, including Author Joan Whitely's history, Young Las Vegas: Before the Future Found Us, published in 2005.

In 2010 the Nevada Press Association named Hopkins to the Nevada Newspaper Hall of Fame. After one of his reporters stated that judges were sealing court cases to avoid embarrassing the well-connected, Hopkins was named to a Nevada Supreme Court commission devising statewide rules to limit such abuses.

Hopkins retired from the Review-Journal in 2011. His first novel, The Boys Who Woke Up Early, was published in March 2019 by Imbrifex Books. The book has been generally well received.

Publications
A.D. Hopkins is a published author and journalist.

Books
 The First 100: Portraits of the Men and Women Who Shaped Las Vegas—Published by Huntington Press (December 2000)
 The Boys Who Woke Up Early—Published by Imbrifex Books (March 2019)

References

External links
 Author Facebook page
 Debut Novel page

Living people
Year of birth missing (living people)
People from Stuart, Virginia
Novelists from Virginia